Candle Lake is a reservoir in the central part of the Canadian province of Saskatchewan in the boreal forest, approximately  north-east of Prince Albert. A dam completed in 1979 at the southern end of the lake regulates water levels; several small creeks feed into the lake and Torch River flows out of the lake at the dam. Candle Lake Provincial Park surrounds most of the lake and the resort village of Candle Lake is at the southern end.

The lake takes its name from a Cree legend about flickering lights appearing near the north end of the lake, which have supposedly been seen right up to contemporary times. Scientists speculate that the lights are likely caused from "swamp gas or a phosphorescent glow created by decaying drift wood", rather than having a paranormal origin.

Highways 265 and 120 provide access to the lake and its amenities.

Parks and recreation 
Candle Lake is a popular tourist destination in Western Canada as most of the lake is surrounded by Candle Lake Provincial Park. Along the lake's shores there are several natural sand beaches including Minowukaw Beach, Waskateena Beach, Candle Lake Beach, and the Purple Sands Beach. The Purple Sands Beach has vibrantly striped bands of sand in purple, magenta, and pink hues. The purple sand comes from garnet that was brought to the region from the Canadian Shield by glaciation during the ice age about 12,000 years ago. Adjacent to Minowukaw Beach are the Minowukaw Sand Dunes. Amenities and activities in and around the lake include sport fishing and other water sports, camping, golfing, hiking, fishing, and boating. Several marinas are dotted around the lake's shore providing boating access to the lake.

Candle Lake dam 
The level in Candle Lake is regulated by a four-bay  concrete dam, constructed in 1978–1979 and operated by the Saskatchewan Watershed Authority. It is located at the south-eastern corner of the lake at Hanson Bay and it discharges into the Torch River.

The construction of the dam prevented the normal spawning movement of fish each spring between the Torch River and Candle Lake. In 2002, the Minowukaw Fishway was constructed to better allow fish to travel between the lake and the river.

Fish species 
Fish commonly found in the lake include walleye, northern pike, lake whitefish, white sucker, shorthead redhorse, longnose sucker, and burbot.

See also 
Saskatchewan Water Security Agency
List of dams and reservoirs in Canada
List of lakes of Saskatchewan

References 

Canadian folklore
Lakes of Saskatchewan
Paddockwood No. 520, Saskatchewan
Dams in Saskatchewan
Hudson's Bay Company trading posts
Division No. 15, Saskatchewan
Dunes of Canada